Tesla Nation is a 2018 Serbian documentary film directed by Željko Mirković starring Jack Dimich. It was shortlisted as a candidate for the Academy Award.

Synopsis
The film follows the history of Serbian Americans and notable people from the group, their contributions to United States and personals stories.

Cast
 Jack Dimich - Nikola Tesla
Helen Delich Bentley - Herself
Walt Bogdanich - Himself
Anna Thea Bogdanovich - Herself
Peter Bogdanovich - Himself
Vladimir Bulovic - Himself
Karl Malden - Himself
Gordana Vunjak-Novakovic - Herself
George Voinovich - Himself

References

External links
 

2018 films
2010s Serbian-language films
2018 documentary films
Serbian documentary films
Cultural depictions of Serbian people